The 2010 New York Jets season was the franchise's 51st season overall, the team's 41st season in the National Football League and their first season at New Meadowlands Stadium. The team improved on their 9–7 record from 2009 and reached the playoffs again. The Jets were the subject of HBO's training camp series Hard Knocks. The Jets played their first pre-season game home against the New York Giants to open up Meadowlands Stadium. Many considered them AFC East favorites; head coach Rex Ryan went so far as to guarantee a Super Bowl victory. Jets broke a team record with a franchise best 6 consecutive wins on the road with a win against the Lions, followed by a win against the Browns in week 10. In the same victory against the Browns, the Jets became the first team in NFL history to win back-to-back road games in overtime. The Jets were the last NFL team to be undefeated on the road, before suffering a 45–3 loss at the New England Patriots in Week 13. The Jets met the Patriots again five weeks later in the AFC Divisional Round back in Foxborough where New York upset New England 28–21. The following week, the Jets lost 24–19 against the Pittsburgh Steelers in the AFC Championship, ending their hopes of returning to the Super Bowl for the first time in 42 seasons and ending what would have been a Cinderella run. The Jets would have been the first AFC East team other than the Patriots to make a Super Bowl since 1993. They also failed to join the 1985 Patriots, 2005 Steelers, 2007 Giants, that year's Packers, and later the 2020 Buccaneers as the only NFL teams to win 3 straight playoff games on the road.

, this remains the last time the New York Jets qualified for the postseason, and the last time until 2016 an AFC East team other than the Patriots made the playoffs.

Offseason

Acquisitions
WR Larry Taylor, P T. J. Conley, LB Josh Mauga and LB Ezra Butler signed future contracts on January 7, 2010.
Former Canadian Football League alumni, cornerback Bo Smith and wide receiver S. J. Green were signed to future contracts on January 8, 2010.
Long snapper Tanner Purdum was signed on February 5, 2010 from free agency.
Kicker Nick Folk and offensive lineman Mike Turkovich were signed on February 23, 2010 via free agency.
Safety Brodney Pool was signed on March 11, 2010 from free agency.
Running back LaDainian Tomlinson signed with the team on March 14, 2010 from free agency.
Defensive lineman Rodrique Wright was signed on March 16, 2010 from free agency.
Linebacker Lance Laury was signed on March 19, 2010 from free agency.
Kicker Clint Stitser was signed on April 7, 2010 from free agency to compete with Nick Folk.
Linebacker Jason Taylor signed with the Jets on April 20, 2010 after the Miami Dolphins, Taylor's former team, failed to commit to the linebacker. Taylor signed a two-year deal.
Cornerback Donovan Warren who went undrafted in the 2010 NFL Draft was immediately signed by the Jets following the draft. He is expected to compete for a spot as a safety.
Tight end Jeff Cumberland, guard Charlie Tanner, and linebacker Kevin Basped, were signed on April 24, 2010 as an undrafted free agents.
On April 26, 2010, the Jets signed Brian Jackson, Keith Buckman, Jason Lamb, Broderick Stewart, Matt Stommes and Ernest Williams.
On May 3, 2010 the Jets signed linebackers Brashton Satele and Cory Reamer.
On May 14, 2010 the Jets signed OG Marlon Davis and C Robbie Felix.
The Jets signed rookie offensive tackle Aaron Kia on May 18, 2010. Kia previously played for the University of Hawaii in 2009 as their starting left tackle.
On June 3, 2010, the Jets signed former Oregon Duck, DT/DE Simi Toeaina.
On June 11, 2010, the Jets signed former Washington Huskies punter and kicker, Jared Ballman.
The Jets signed NT Martin Tevaseu, an undrafted free agent from UNLV, on July 20, 2010.
Veteran quarterback Mark Brunell signed a two-year deal with the Jets on July 28, 2010.
Safety Emanuel Cook signed with the team on July 29, 2010.
On August 2, 2010, the Jets signed wide receiver Vic Hall. Hall previously had a brief tenure with the Chicago Bears.
On August 8, 2010, the Jets announced that offensive lineman Adam Tadisch had been signed. Tadisch played collegiately at North Dakota State before spending the 2010 season with the Cleveland Gladiators of the Arena Football League.
On August 9, 2010, the Jets signed former Stephen F. Austin linebacker Tim Knicky.
On August 14, 2010, the Jets signed offensive guard Chet Teofilo.
On August 19, 2010, the Jets signed linebacker Boris Lee who formerly played for Troy.
Veteran wide receiver Laveranues Coles signed with the Jets on July 30, 2010. The signing marked Coles' third stint with the team.
On August 24, 2010, the Jets signed wide receiver Brooks Foster and safety Keith Fitzhugh.
On August 31, 2010, the Jets signed defensive end Ricky Foley.
On September 5, 2010, the Jets claimed wide receiver Patrick Turner, offensive lineman Patrick Brown and Marcus Dixon off waivers.
Defensive lineman Trevor Pryce was signed on September 30, 2010.

Departures
Cornerback Donald Strickland was released on March 5, 2010 after one season.
Linebacker Broderick Stewart was waived on May 3, 2010.
Center Michael Parenton was waived on May 14, 2010. Parenton had previously spent the 2009 season on the Jets practice squad and was given a future/reserve contract in February.
Offensive Lineman Keith Buckman was waived on May 14, 2010.
On May 18, 2010, the Jets released S. J. Green and Matt Stommes, following the first Organized Team Activities practice of the year.
On May 27, 2010, Kicker Clint Stitser was waived by the team after failing to impress during organized team activities.
On June 22, 2010, safety Brannon Condren, kicker Jared Ballman and defensive tackle Ernest Williams were cut by the team.
The Jets waived defensive tackle Simi Toeaina on July 12, 2010.
The team waived linebacker Ezra Butler on July 29, 2010.
The Jets waived wide receiver Britt Davis on August 1, 2010.
On August 8, 2010, the Jets waived Aaron Kia and Kevin Basped.
On August 14, 2010, the Jets waived offensive lineman Marlon Davis.
On August 19, 2010, the Jets waived punter T. J. Conley.
On August 24, 2010, the Jets waived receiver Vic Hall and offensive tackle Adam Tadisch.
On August 29, 2010, the Jets waived defensive lineman Rodrique Wright, and wide receivers Aundrae Allison, Marcus Henry and Laveranues Coles.
On August 31, 2010, the Jets released backup quarterback Kevin O'Connell.
On September 4, 2010, the Jets waived Emanuel Cook, Jason Davis, Keith Fitzhugh, Ricky Foley, Brooks Foster, Josh Mauga, Bo Smith, Ty Steinkuhler, Robby Felix, Dan Gay, Tim Knicky, Jason Lamb, Boris Lee, Cory Reamer, Brashton Satele, Charlie Tanner, Larry Taylor, Chet Teofilo, Martin Tevaseu, Donovan Warren and Mike Turkovich.
On September 5, 2010, the Jets waived David Clowney and Chauncey Washington while releasing Tony Richardson.
On October 26, 2010, the Jets waived defensive tackle Howard Green in order to promote linebacker Josh Mauga to the active roster.

Free agents

Contract extensions
On July 7, 2010, D'Brickashaw Ferguson signed a five-year contract extension with the option of a sixth year being picked up.
On July 30, 2010, the team announced that head coach Rex Ryan and general manager Mike Tannenbaum both received contract extensions through 2014.
On August 8, 2010, special teams coordinator Mike Westhoff received a one-year contract extension. Westhoff will remain with the team through 2011 and barring any setbacks will retire following the 2011 season.
On August 24, 2010, center Nick Mangold signed a seven-year, $55 million contract extension with $22.5 million in guarantees. By signing the extension, Mangold became the highest paid center in the National Football League at the time.
On September 5, 2010, head coach Rex Ryan and owner Woody Johnson visited cornerback Darrelle Revis at his Florida home. Revis, who had been disgruntled over a contract dispute with the team, agreed in principle to sign a four-year $46 million contract with $32 million guaranteed. The team announced the signing on September 6.

Trades

To Jets
Antonio Cromartie was traded to the Jets on March 4, 2010 from the San Diego Chargers for a third round 2011 NFL Draft pick, that can possibly turn into a second round depending on his performance.
Santonio Holmes was traded to the Jets on April 11, 2010 from the Pittsburgh Steelers for a fifth round 2010 NFL Draft pick.

From Jets
Kerry Rhodes was traded to the Arizona Cardinals on March 6, 2010 for a fourth round 2010 NFL Draft pick and a seventh round 2011 NFL Draft pick.
On April 24, 2010, the Jets traded Leon Washington and their seventh round pick in the 2010 NFL Draft to the Seattle Seahawks for Seattle's fifth round pick which the Jets used to select FB John Conner.

2010 NFL Draft

Staff

Final roster

Preseason

Regular season

Schedule

Note: Intra-division opponents are in bold text.

Standings

Division

Conference

Regular Season Game Summaries

Week 1: vs. Baltimore Ravens

The Jets began their season at home for an AFC duel with the Baltimore Ravens. In the first quarter, the Jets took the early lead with kicker Nick Folk hitting a 23-yard field goal. Then he nailed a 28-yard field goal in the second quarter to bring the Jets up 6–0. After that, the Ravens replied and took the lead when RB Willis McGahee completed a 1-yard TD run. The Ravens extended their lead in the third quarter when kicker Billy Cundiff got a 25-yard field goal. The Jets cut the lead in the fourth quarter with Folk making a 48-yard field goal, but it wasn't enough, giving the Jets a loss.

With the close loss, the Jets began at 0–1.

Week 2: vs. New England Patriots

The Jets started slow by accruing no passing yards during the first quarter, but the Patriots went down the field in two long drives taking up most of the time in the first half. In the second quarter, the Patriots took the early lead as quarterback Tom Brady completed a 6-yard touchdown pass to wide receiver Wes Welker, but the Jets replied with quarterback Mark Sanchez completing a 10-yard touchdown pass to wide receiver Braylon Edwards. The Patriots scored again with Brady finding wide receiver Randy Moss on a 34-yard touchdown pass. The Jets narrowed the Patriots' lead when kicker Nick Folk nailed a 49-yard field goal, followed by him making a 36-yard field goad in the third quarter. The Jets got the lead when Sanchez completed a 2-yard touchdown pass to wide receiver Jerricho Cotchery (with a successful 2-point conversion). The Jets extended their lead in the fourth quarter when Sanchez making a 1-yard touchdown pass to tight end Dustin Keller.

With the win, the Jets improved to 1–1.

Week 3: at Miami Dolphins

Coming off their divisional win over the Patriots, the Jets flew to Sun Life Stadium for a Week 3 AFC East duel with the Miami Dolphins on Sunday night. New York delivered the game's opening strike in the first quarter as quarterback Mark Sanchez completed a 24-yard touchdown pass to tight end Dustin Keller. The Jets added onto their lead in the second quarter as Sanchez hooked up with Keller again on a 12-yard touchdown pass. The Dolphins answered as quarterback Chad Henne connected with tight end Anthony Fasano on a 3-yard touchdown pass, followed by kicker Dan Carpenter making a 44-yard field goal.

Miami took the lead in the third quarter as Henne found wide receiver Brandon Marshall on an 11-yard touchdown pass, yet New York immediately struck back as Sanchez completed a 67-yard touchdown pass to wide receiver Braylon Edwards. The Dolphins cut into the lead as Carpenter made a 20-yard field goal. In the fourth quarter, the Jets responded with kicker Nick Folk making a 30-yard field goal. Miami struck back with Carpenter's 50-yard field goal, yet New York stayed persistent as running back LaDainian Tomlinson got a 1-yard touchdown run. Miami tried to get a comeback drive going, but the defense came through to hold onto the victory.

With the win, the Jets improved to 2–1.

Week 4: at Buffalo Bills

Coming off their divisional road win over the Dolphins, the Jets flew to Ralph Wilson Stadium for a Week 4 AFC East duel with the throwback-clad Buffalo Bills. New York scored in the first quarter as running back LaDainian Tomlinson got a 1-yard touchdown run. The Jets added onto their lead in the second quarter with a 19-yard field goal from kicker Nick Folk, followed by quarterback Mark Sanchez completing a 41-yard touchdown pass to wide receiver Braylon Edwards. The Bills closed out the half with quarterback Ryan Fitzpatrick finding tight end David Martin on a 4-yard touchdown pass.

New York pulled away in the third quarter as tight end Dustin Keller caught a 3-yard touchdown pass from wide receiver/quarterback Brad Smith, followed by his 2-yard touchdown reception thrown by Sanchez. Afterwards, Tomlinson's 26-yard touchdown run effectively secured the victory. Buffalo closed out the game in the fourth quarter as Fitzpatrick threw a touchdown pass to wide receiver Stevie Johnson.

With the win, the Jets improved to 3–1.

Week 5: vs. Minnesota Vikings

Coming off their dominating divisional road win over the Bills, the Jets went home for a Week 5 interconference duel with the Minnesota Vikings on Monday night. New York took flight in the first quarter as kicker Nick Folk made a 25-yard field goal. The Jets added onto their lead in the second quarter as Folk booted a 53-yard and a 22-yard field goal.

New York continued to build their lead in the third quarter as Folk nailed a 34-yard field goal. The Vikings answered with quarterback Brett Favre completed a 37-yard touchdown pass to wide receiver Randy Moss, yet the Jets came right back with Folk's 31-yard field goal. After the match was delayed due to adverse weather conditions, Minnesota began to strike back in the fourth quarter as Favre connected with wide receiver Percy Harvin on a 34-yard touchdown pass (with a failed 2-point conversion). Afterwards, New York answer as running back Shonn Greene got a 23-yard touchdown run. The Vikings tried to rally as Favre found Harvin again on an 11-yard touchdown pass, yet the Jets put the game away as cornerback Dwight Lowery returned an interception 26 yards for a touchdown.

With the win, New York improved to 4–1.

Week 6: at Denver Broncos

Hoping to increase their winning streak the Jets flew to INVESCO Field at Mile High for an AFC duel with the Broncos. In the 2nd quarter the Jets took the lead as QB Mark Sanchez made a 32-yard TD pass to WR Braylon Edwards. But Denver replied with QB Tim Tebow scrambling 5 yards to the endzone for a touchdown. This was followed by kicker Matt Prater nailing a 59-yard field goal. In the third quarter the Jets responded with kicker Nick Folk hitting a 56-yard field goal. The Jets fell behind when QB Kyle Orton made a 17-yard TD pass to WR Demaryius Thomas. But replied in the fourth quarter with RB LaDainian Tomlinson making a 20-yard TD run. The Jets trailed again with Prater making a 48-yard field goal. But pulled back in the lead when Tomlinson got a 2-yard TD run.

With the win, the Jets improve to 5–1.

Week 7: BYE

Week 8: vs. Green Bay Packers

The Jets’ seventh game was an interconference duel with the Packers. Punter Steve Weatherford made the game's most controversial decision in the first quarter, opting to attempt a fake punt and run for the first down on 4th and 18. Weatherford was stopped a yard short of the first down, giving the Packers ideal field position which eventually led to an early 3–0 Packers lead. "He does it on his own," Ryan said. "(The Packers) were caving that side down. This was something Steve did on his own. I don't think he realized we'd just been sacked. We told him before that it needed to be a manageable situation, not fourth-and-20 or whatever it was.". In a game where defense ruled, the Packers lead 3–0 at halftime.  The Jets challenged a Brad Smith fumble, and lost due to his knee not being down before losing the ball.  However, the Jets second challenge went to a jump ball, called an interception after Packers cornerback Tramon Williams ripped the ball out of Jerricho Cotchery's hands while they were both on the ground.  The play was controversially upheld, despite the fact that the receiver appeared to be down by contact.  With no challenges left, Mark Sanchez threw a ball to Dustin Keller that was ripped out of his hands and ruled an interception in the 4th quarter. The replay showed that Keller made the catch and was also down before losing possession, but with no challenges left the Jets were left with nothing. Green Bay took a 6–0 lead after the turnover. The Jets had two more chances to take the lead but had drives halted on 4th and longs. The Packers added on another field goal late to finalize a 9–0 win in the New Meadowlands Stadium. This marked the first time since 2006 the Jets were shut out and they failed to win 6 games in a row for the first time since 1986.

With the loss, the Jets fell to 5–2.

Week 9: at Detroit Lions

Hoping to rebound from their loss against the Packers, the Jets flew to Ford Field for an interconference duel with the Lions. In the first quarter the Jets trailed early as quarterback Matthew Stafford found tight end Brandon Pettigrew on a 10-yard touchdown pass. The Jets fought back and took the lead with Nick Folk hitting a 31-yard field goal, followed by quarterback Mark Sanchez completing a 74-yard touchdown pass to wide receiver Braylon Edwards. In the third quarter the Jets fell behind again as Stafford scrambled 1-yard for a touchdown however, the Lions missed the extra point, attempted by Ndamukong Suh who replaced the injured Jason Hanson. The miss proved to be instrumental in New York's victory.

Stafford followed up with 2-yard touchdown pass to wide receiver Nate Burleson in the fourth quarter. The Jets responded as Sanchez scrambled 1 yard for a touchdown, and then Nick Folk tied the game after making a 36-yard field goal that sent the game into overtime. With New York winning the coin toss, they began to move down field and after Sanchez found receiver Santonio Holmes on a 52-yard pass play, the Jets were in a position to win via field goal. Subsequently, Folk made the 30-yard field goal to lift the Jets over the Lions.

With the win, the Jets improved to 6–2.

Week 10: at Cleveland Browns

Coming off their win over the Lions, the Jets flew to Cleveland Browns Stadium for a Week 10 duel with the Cleveland Browns. New York trailed in the first quarter as Browns kicker Phil Dawson made a 34-yard field goal. The Jets answered with a 27-yard field goal from kicker Nick Folk, but Cleveland responded with running back Peyton Hillis getting a 12-yard touchdown run. New York tied the game in the second quarter with quarterback Mark Sanchez finding wide receiver Jerricho Cotchery on a 25-yard touchdown pass. The Browns regained the lead with Dawson's 23-yard field goal, yet the Jets took the lead with Sanchez's 1-yard touchdown run. After a scoreless third quarter, New York added onto their lead in the fourth quarter with Folk's 25-yard field goal. However, Cleveland tied the game with quarterback Colt McCoy completing a 3-yard touchdown pass to wide receiver Mohamed Massaquoi. In overtime, Sanchez found wide receiver Santonio Holmes on the game-ending 37-yard touchdown pass. The Jets became the first team in league history to win back-to-back overtime games on the road.

With the win, New York improved to 7–2.

Week 11: vs. Houston Texans

Hoping to increase their winning streak the Jets played on home ground for an AFC duel with the Texans. In the first quarter the Jets took the lead as kicker Nick Folk nailed a 37-yard field goal. The Texans replied in the second quarter with RB Arian Foster getting a 2-yard TD run. The Jets got the lead back as QB Mark Sanchez threw a 4-yard TD pass to WR Santonio Holmes; followed by Folk making a 30-yard field goal. The Jets' lead extended in the third quarter when Sanchez found Holmes again on a 41-yard TD pass. In the fourth quarter Folk made a 30-yard field goal to put the Jets up 23–7. The Texans rallied to take the lead back with kicker Neil Rackers nailing a 38-yard field goal, followed by QB Matt Schaub completing a 43-yard TD pass to TE Joel Dreessen, followed by Foster getting a 1-yard TD run, and then Rackers got a 22-yard field goal. The Jets still managed to score to get the win with Sanchez finding Holmes again on a 6-yard TD pass.

With the win, the Jets improve to 8–2.

Week 12: vs. Cincinnati Bengals (Thanksgiving Day Game)

Coming off their win over the Texans, the Jets stayed at home for a Week 12 Thanksgiving duel with the Cincinnati Bengals. After a scoreless first quarter, the Jets delivered the game's opening strike in the second quarter with a 27-yard field goal from kicker Nick Folk, but the Bengals answered with quarterback Carson Palmer completing a 5-yard touchdown pass to wide receiver Jordan Shipley.

New York regained the lead with a 53-yard touchdown end-around from wide receiver/quarterback Brad Smith and a 13-yard touchdown pass from Mark Sanchez to Santonio Holmes. Cincinnati responded in the fourth quarter as Aaron Pettrey kicked a 28-yard field goal, but the Jets added Smith's 89-yard kick return for a touchdown, followed by defensive end Trevor Pryce sacking Palmer in the endzone for a safety.

With the win, New York improved to 9–2. Smith (3 carries, 55 yards, TD, 3 kick returns, 122 return yards, TD) and cornerback Darrelle Revis (4 tackles, 1 sack) were named NFL Network's 2010 Pudding Pie Award winners.

Week 13: at New England Patriots

Coming off their win over the Bengals on Thanksgiving, the Jets traveled to Foxborough in Monday Night Football game with the New England Patriots. In the first quarter, the Patriots took the early lead, with a 41-yard field goal from kicker Shayne Graham, followed by a 1-yard touchdown run from running back BenJarvus Green-Ellis and a 25-yard touchdown pass from quarterback Tom Brady to wide receiver Deion Branch. In the second quarter, the Jets got on the board, with a 39-yard field goal from kicker Nick Folk, in what would be the Jets' only score of the game. Later in the second quarter, the Patriots replied, with Brady throwing a 4-yard touchdown pass to wide receiver Brandon Tate. The Patriots continued their offensive onslaught in the third quarter, with Brady throwing an 18-yard touchdown pass to wide receiver Wes Welker. In the fourth quarter, Brady threw a 1-yard touchdown pass to tight end Aaron Hernandez, followed by a 5-yard touchdown run from Green-Ellis.

With the loss the Jets dropped to 9–3 and second place in the AFC East.

Week 14: vs. Miami Dolphins

Hoping to rebound from their loss to the Patriots the Jets played on home ground for an AFC East rivalry match against the Dolphins. The Jets trailed early with kicker Dan Carpenter nailing a 47-yard field goal, followed by QB Chad Henne completing a 6-yard TD pass to WR Brandon Marshall. They tried to cut the lead but only came away with kicker Nick Folk hitting a 35 and a 42-yard field goal.

With the loss, the Jets fell to 9–4.

Week 15: at Pittsburgh Steelers

With the win, the Jets improved to 10–4.

Week 16: at Chicago Bears

Coming off their win over the Steelers the Jets played an interconference duel with the Bears. In the first quarter the Jets trailed early as kicker Robbie Gould got a 37-yard field goal, followed by Matt Forte getting a 22-yard TD run. The Jets pulled ahead with RB Shonn Greene getting a 3-yard TD run, followed by CB Dwight Lowery returning an interception 20 yards for a touchdown, followed by RB LaDainian Tomlinson getting a 3-yard TD run letting the Jets lead 21–10. The lead was narrowed as QB Jay Cutler scrambled 2 yards for a touchdown, but was soon extended as kicker Nick Folk made a 26-yard field goal. They trailed again with Cutler completing a 40 and a 25-yard TD pass to wide receivers Devin Hester and Johnny Knox respectively, but soon were able to tie the game with QB Mark Sanchez throwing a 23-yard TD pass to WR Santonio Holmes. The Bears escaped the tie with Cutler finding Knox again on a 26-yard TD pass. The Jets tried to come back, but only came away with a 34-yard field goal from Folk. When the Jets got the ball back, Sanchez threw a pass intended for Holmes, only to be intercepted by safety Chris Harris with 0:58 to go.

With the loss, the Jets fell to 10–5, but clinched a playoff berth when the Jaguars lost to the Redskins..

Week 17: vs. Buffalo Bills

The Jets’ sixteenth game was a division rivalry rematch against the Bills at home. The Jets commanded the first half with kicker Nick Folk making a 28-yard field goal, followed by CB Marquice Cole returning an interception 35 yards for a touchdown, then with QB Mark Brunell making a 17-yard TD pass to WR Santonio Holmes. Their offense broke down a bit as Brunell's next pass was intercepted by FS Jairus Byrd and returned 37 yards for a touchdown, but continued to score after Brunell found WR Braylon Edwards on a 52-yard TD pass. This was followed by QB Kellen Clemens scrambling 10 yards for a touchdown, then with RB John Conner getting a 16-yard TD run.

With the win, the Jets finish on an 11–5 record.

Postseason

Schedule

Game summaries

AFC Wild Card Playoffs: at (3) Indianapolis Colts

Entering the postseason as the AFC's sixth seed, the Jets began their playoff run at Lucas Oil Stadium for the AFC Wild Card Round against the third seeded Indianapolis Colts in a rematch of the 2009–10 AFC Championship Game. After a scoreless first quarter, New York trailed in the second quarter as Colts quarterback Peyton Manning completed a 57-yard touchdown pass to wide receiver Pierre Garçon.

The Jets tied the game in the third quarter with a 1-yard touchdown run from running back LaDainian Tomlinson, however Indianapolis immediately came back with a 47-yard Adam Vinatieri field goal. New York took the lead in the fourth quarter with another 1-yard touchdown run from Tomlinson, but the Colts regained the lead with Vinatieri nailing a 32-yard and a 50-yard field goal. However, the Jets prevailed in the end; as time expired, Nick Folk kicked the game-winning 32-yard field goal. This also ended up being Peyton Manning's last game as a Colt, as he would sit out the next season due to neck surgeries, and be released by the Colts then subsequently signed with the Denver Broncos.

With the win, New York improved their overall record to 12–5.

AFC Divisional Playoffs: at (1) New England Patriots

Coming off their win over the Colts, the Jets flew to Gillette Stadium for the AFC Divisional Round against the top-seeded New England Patriots, in Round 3 of their 2010 series.  New York trailed in the first quarter as Patriots kicker Shayne Graham made a 34-yard field goal.  The Jets took the lead in the second quarter as quarterback Mark Sanchez found running back LaDainian Tomlinson on a 7-yard touchdown pass.  After a failed fake-punt attempt by New England, Sanchez connected with wide receiver Braylon Edwards on a 15-yard touchdown pass.

New England began to cut away at their deficit as quarterback Tom Brady completed a 2-yard touchdown pass to tight end Alge Crumpler (with a successful two-point conversion run from running back Sammy Morris).  The Jets answered back when Mark Sanchez connected with Santionio Holmes in the corner of the endzone, extending the lead back to 21–11. The Patriots tried to rally as Graham got a 35-yard field goal, yet New York came right back with a 20-yard touchdown run from running back Shonn Greene.  Afterwards, New England closed out the game as Brady completed a 13-yard touchdown pass to wide receiver Deion Branch.

With the win, the Jets improved to 13–5. The Jets defense set a franchise single-game postseason record by sacking Brady five times.

AFC Championship: at (2) Pittsburgh Steelers

Coming off their win over the Patriots, the Jets flew to Heinz Field for the AFC Championship Game against the No. 2 Pittsburgh Steelers, in a rematch of their Week 15 game.

New York trailed in the first quarter as Steelers running back Rashard Mendenhall got a 1-yard touchdown run.  Pittsburgh added onto their lead in the second quarter as kicker Shaun Suisham got a 20-yard field goal, followed by quarterback Ben Roethlisberger getting a 2-yard touchdown run, along with cornerback William Gay returning a fumble 19 yards for a touchdown.  The Jets closed out the half with a 42-yard field goal from kicker Nick Folk.

New York began the third quarter with quarterback Mark Sanchez finding former Pittsburgh wide receiver Santonio Holmes on a 45-yard touchdown pass.  The Jets tried to rally as Roethlisberger fumbled the snap in the endzone and then got tackled in the endzone by Mike DeVito for a safety, followed by Sanchez hooking up with wide receiver Jerricho Cotchery on a 4-yard touchdown pass.  However, the Steelers held on to preserve the win.

With the loss, New York's season came to an end with an overall record of 13–6.

References

New York Jets seasons
New York Jets
New York Jets season
21st century in East Rutherford, New Jersey
Meadowlands Sports Complex